Mercury: The Afterlife and Times of a Rock God is a 1997 monodrama written by Charles Messina about the life and death of Queen lead singer Freddie Mercury.  It presents Mercury in the moments just after his death, during which he is confronted with self-examination as he "seeks redemption before a God unimpressed by his celebrity."

Synopsis 

Farrokh Bulsara was a boy of Persian heritage who never quite fit into his skin or his teeth.  It wasn't until he became a young man that he discovered his talent and true nature, and was reborn as Freddie Mercury.  After a brilliant career, with the arenas empty and the lights out, on the night of November 24, 1991, Freddie is forced to surrender his celebrity and face the frailty of his own humanity.  As he succumbs to AIDS, the worldwide icon seeks redemption before a God unimpressed with celebrity. In his ultimate struggle to make sense of his grim fate, Mercury realizes that his fame, fortune, and talents are no longer enough to sustain him; that beyond the darkness of his fears, shines a light far brighter than the star he was on Earth.

Premiere 

The play debuted at the Sanford Meisner Theatre in New York City's  Chelsea district on November 24, 1997, at 6:48pm - the 6th anniversary of Mercury's death.   The part of Freddie was played by Khalid Gonçalves (né Paul Gonçalves).

On opening night of the play, then-New York City Council member Tom Duane introduced the show.

The play ran every night until December 7.

Second run 

The play began its second run on February 14, 1998.

On February 17, rock musician Billy Squier, a longtime friend of Freddie's, debuted a song that he wrote in memory of him titled I Have Watched You Fly on stage before a performance of the play.  He introduced the song by saying, "I knew Freddie as a friend.  I'm honored to share the stage with him in the afterlife."

The play was also performed every night during the second run, ending on March 8, 1998.

Proceeds from the ticket sales of both runs were donated to Gay Men's Health Crisis and The Mercury Phoenix Trust.

Revival and tour 

On January 11, 2004, the play experienced a successful revival with a three-month run at the Triad Theater, also in New York City, with Messina again as writer/director and featuring Amir Darvish in the role of Freddie.

In 2006, the play also had a special, limited engagement from August 30 to September 2 at The Art House in Provincetown, Massachusetts.

Publication 

In 2009, the play was published by Original Works Publishing.  Proceeds from the sale of the play will be donated to AmfAR, The Foundation for AIDS Research.

Reception 

Both incarnations of the play have received favorable reviews from Queen fans and from the music and theater press, notably Billboard, The New Yorker, Time Out New York, Zagat Survey, and Backstage. On November 26, 2011, the play was recognized by Flavorwire.com in their list of 15 Artistic Tributes to Freddie Mercury.

One frequent criticism of the play is the absence of music, particularly the discography from Queen and Mercury's solo career that audiences would associate Mercury with. In a 1997 interview with Playbill.com, Gonçalves said, "All the things I've seen about Mercury focus on the music, career and persona; very little has been discussed about the person. Not only did Charles write a play about Mercury, he captured the humanity." "Charles and I agreed that doing a musical about Mercury would take away from what we're trying to do in getting to the core of this person. The ultimate goal is to make a film of Mercury's life."

Likewise, Darvish, in a 2004 interview with Access Hollywood, stated that, "We wanted to stray away from the music.  We wanted to tell his story.  He has a story.  Everyone knows the music.  People are familiar with the music.  It's his story, and where he's come from, and what he's done that people don't know.

Milestone 

Mercury: The Afterlife and Times of a Rock God marked the first time the life of Freddie Mercury had been presented in a theatrical form.

A film version of the play is currently in development.

References 

1997 plays
Monodrama
Biographical plays about musicians
Cultural depictions of Freddie Mercury
Plays set in the 1990s
Plays set in England
Fiction about death